Garrett Stewart (born January 5, 1945) is an American literary and film theorist. He has served as the James O. Freedman Professor of Letters in the English Department at the University of Iowa since 1993.

Career 
Stewart graduated with a B.A. from the University of Southern California in 1967 and then earned a Ph.D. in English from Yale University in 1971. He taught at Boston University and the University of California, Santa Barbara before joining the University of Iowa faculty.

Across his career, Stewart has pursued a methodology of intense close-reading in the mediums of print, film, and (most recently) conceptual art. He describes his own work as existing at the intersection of stylistics and narrative theory. Examining the ways in which the larger structures of plot are operative at even the smallest of scales prompted Stewart in 2007 to develop the term "narratography"—i.e., a mapping of the ways in which technique constructs a particular narrative mode, whether in terms of stylistics (print) or editing/montage (film). Stewart describes narratography as "searching out the 'microplots' of narrative development in the inflections of technique, audiovisual or linguistic".

Work and main ideas 
In his 1990 book Reading Voices: Literature and the Phonotext, Stewart argues that literature, despite its visual appearance, is essentially an acoustic medium. He draws on the neurophysiological phenomenon of "subvocalization" to suggest that literary poetics are produced by the "voice" that the reader gives to a text—what Stewart calls the "phonetic undertow of literary writing". Subvocalization has been corroborated by empirical science. Minuscule movements in the larynx and other muscles involved in speech have been observed in subjects during silent reading. While the vocal cords do not outwardly activate, it has been proposed that subvocalization reduces the cognitive load on working memory, and that reading comprehension depends as much on the way words "sound" in the reader's mind as it does on the words' visual (typographical) arrangement. Stewart argues that this phonotext, so often ignored by the "phonophobia" of post-Derridean deconstruction, opens up new inroads to literary analysis. When Shakespeare's Juliet asks "What's in a name?", for example, aurally she might also declare, "What sin a name". Stewart argues that our traditionally vision-centric reading habits cause us to be "deaf" to these permutations. 

In his 1999 book Between Film and Screen: Modernism's Photo Synthesis, Stewart draws on ideas in film theory—specifically the work of Gilles Deleuze as well as British screen theory and its emphasis on the cinematic apparatus—to argue that as an art form cinema is haunted by its basis in still photography. While cinema creates the illusion of live action, this is only made possible by a strip of still frames as they speed past the projector. Stewart is interested in the ways in which film tries, and often fails, to repress this stillness in its representations of time and movement. In this respect, he views the various techniques of cinematic plotting to be influenced—if not determined—by the very machinery that makes them possible. If that's the case, then new/different film technologies ought to engender new/different kinds of plots and cinematic styles. Such is Stewart's contention in a follow-up book, Framed Time: Toward a Postfilmic Cinema (2007), where he argues that digital filmmaking is subsequently haunted by its basis, not in still photography, but the pixel array, leading to the internally-morphing representations of time in recent sci-fi films like the Wachowskis' The Matrix (1999) or Spielberg's Minority Report (2002).

Stewart has published numerous other books, ranging from language in Charles Dickens to representations of death in British fiction. His 2009 Novel Violence: A Narratography of Victorian Fiction was awarded the Perkins Prize from the International Society for the Study of Narrative. More recently his scholarship has turned toward digital cinema and modes of surveillance (e.g., Closed Circuits: Screening Narrative Surveillance [2014]) as well as conceptual art (e.g., Bookwork: Medium to Object to Concept to Art [2011] and Transmedium: Conceptualism 2.0 and the New Object Art [2017]). He describes the common linkage between these various projects:

 

Stewart remains active in his research and teaching at the University of Iowa. He was inducted into the American Academy of Arts and Sciences in 2010.

References 

1945 births
Living people
American literary theorists
Yale University alumni
University of Iowa faculty
University of California, Santa Barbara faculty
University of Southern California alumni